Lazy Susan is a 2020 American comedy film directed by Nick Peet and starring Sean Hayes.

Plot
A frumpy, bumbling, unmotivated woman named Susan always manages to get herself into the most ridiculous situations imaginable. One day, Susan wakes up to realize that her relationships have all tanked, her family is estranged, and she has no prospects. She decides to take charge and turn things around but finds that becoming a better woman on her own is difficult.

Cast

Reception

References

External links
 

American comedy films
2020 LGBT-related films
2020 films
American LGBT-related films
LGBT-related comedy films
2020 comedy films
2020s English-language films
2020s American films